A list of Spanish-produced and co-produced feature films released in the country in 2021. When applicable, the domestic theatrical release date is favoured.

Films

Box office 
The ten highest-grossing Spanish films in 2021, by domestic box office gross revenue, are as follows:

See also 
 36th Goya Awards
 List of 2021 box office number-one films in Spain

References
Informational notes

Citations

External links
 Spanish films of 2021 at the Internet Movie Database

Spanish
2021
Films